Dudley Kenneth George de Silva (1911–1974) was a Sri Lankan educationist. 

He was Principal of Royal College Colombo and Director of Technical Education, Ministry of Education.

Born in Ceylon, he was educated at Royal College Colombo and at the University College Colombo where he gained a BSc and later gained a Diploma in Education.

He taught at Kingswood College, Kandy and became Principal of the Wanduramba Central School and of the Piliyandala Central College. He was an Education Officer in Charge of Adult Education. Thereafter he became the Principal  of his alma mater, Royal College Colombo from 1954 to 1966. In 1966 he was made Director of Technical Education.

Long after retiring as Principal, Royal College Colombo, he took up post as Principal, Pembroke Academy, Flower Road, Colombo 7.

He was an Organist at St. Paul's Church Milagiriya and St. Paul's Church Kandy. The  Dudley de Silva Shield  is awarded at the annual hockey encounter between Royal College Colombo and Wesley College, Colombo in his memory.

References

Sri Lankan educational theorists
People from British Ceylon
Alumni of Royal College, Colombo
Alumni of the Ceylon University College
1911 births
1974 deaths
Principals of Royal College, Colombo